was a Japanese artist who worked mainly with woodblock prints. He was born in Kōfu, Yamanashi. Between 1921 and 1929 he lived in Korea and Manchuria. He studied at the Tokyo School of Fine Arts, where he graduated at the Oil Painting Section in 1938. While still there he attended Un'ichi Hiratsuka's extracurricular woodblock printing course, and in the same year he became quality controller at the Takamizawa Woodblock Print Company. He was conscripted into the army in 1943. In 1945 he had lost his house, his atelier and nearly all his early works. Around 1950 he had sufficiently recovered to start painting again. At the same time he started making Sōsaku Hanga, both figurative and abstract prints. He was known as a constant innovator and he was generally considered one of the best post-World War II Sōsaku Hanga artists.

External links
 Biography of Hideo Hagiwara
 Gallery
 Biography and prints of Hideo Hagiwara

1913 births
2007 deaths
Artists from Yamanashi Prefecture
20th-century Japanese painters